The Fürstenberg-Rennen is a Group 3 flat horse race in Germany open to three-year-old thoroughbreds. It is run at a variety of German racecourses, over a distance of 2,000 metres (about 1¼ miles), and it is scheduled to take place each year in August.
The race was run at Baden-Baden until 2010.

History
The event was established in 1880, and it was originally contested over 2,400 metres. For a period it was known as the Preis von Iffezheim.

The distance of the race was modified several times during the early 1900s. It began a spell over 2,200 metres in 1957.

The present race grading system was introduced in Germany in 1972, and the Fürstenberg-Rennen was given Group 3 status. It was cut to 2,000 metres in 2001.

The event was titled the Belmondo-Preis in 2010. It was held at Hanover as the Grosser Preis des Audi Zentrums Hannover in 2011.

The race was run over 2,100 metres at Düsseldorf in 2012, and on this occasion it was called the Grosser Sparkassenpreis.

Records
Leading jockey (5 wins):
 Andrasch Starke – Hibiscus (1999), Pryor (2001), Willingly (2002), Day Walker (2005), Elle Shadow (2010)

Leading trainer (7 wins):
 Sven von Mitzlaff – Ordinate (1959), Kaiseradler (1960), Sudan (1962), Celia (1963), Nachtflug (1965), Lilie (1969), Caracol (1972)
 Heinz Jentzsch – Lombard (1970), Monzeno (1975), Anno (1982), Lirung (1985), El Salto (1986), Zampano (1987), Solon (1995)
 (note: the trainers of some of the early winners are unknown)

Winners from 1969 at Baden-Baden

Winners since 2011

Earlier winners

 1880: Kaleb
 1881: Wildschütz
 1882: Tittle Tattle
 1883: Maria
 1884: Cambus
 1885: Triftig
 1886: Dictator
 1887: Lucretia
 1888: Wallfahrt
 1889: Fledermaus
 1890: Barde
 1891: Tambour-Major
 1892: Nora
 1893: Ilse
 1894: Königskrone
 1895: Armbruster
 1896: Armbruster
 1897: Geranium
 1898: Nicosia
 1899: Gobseck
 1900: Winfried
 1901: Slanderer
 1902: Nordlandfahrer
 1903: La Chine
 1904: Macdonald II
 1905: Phoenix
 1906: Derby Cup / Hammurabi *
 1907: Sejan
 1908: Faust
 1909: Frere Luce
 1910: Maboul
 1911: Royal Flower
 1912: Sarrasin
 1913: Cyklon
 1914–20: no race
 1921: Chrysolith
 1922: Alpenrose
 1923: Ganelon
 1924: Rosalba Carriera
 1925: Weissdorn
 1926: Naplopo
 1927: Oleander
 1928: Castel Sardo
 1929: Tantris
 1930: Alba
 1931: Wolkenflug
 1932: Ostermädel
 1933: Unkenruf
 1934: Ehrenpreis
 1935: Contessina
 1936: Wahnfried
 1937: Gaio
 1938: Procle
 1939: Octavianus
 1940: no race
 1941: Nuvolari
 1942: Aureolus
 1943–51: no race
 1952: Leidenschaft
 1953: Salut
 1954: Makra
 1955: Masetto
 1956: Bernardus
 1957: Nisos
 1958: Aletsch
 1959: Ordinate
 1960: Kaiseradler
 1961: Arardo
 1962: Sudan
 1963: Celia
 1964: Marinus
 1965: Nachtflug
 1966: Sawara
 1967: Bussard
 1968: Seebirk

* The 1906 race was a dead-heat and has joint winners.

See also
 List of German flat horse races

References
 Racing Post / siegerlisten.com:
 1983, 1984, 1985, 1986, 1987, 

 galopp-sieger.de – Fürstenberg-Rennen (vormals Preis von Iffezheim).
 horseracingintfed.com – International Federation of Horseracing Authorities – Race Detail (2012).
 pedigreequery.com – Fürstenberg-Rennen – Baden-Baden.

Flat horse races for three-year-olds
Horse races in Germany
Recurring sporting events established in 1880
Sport in Baden-Württemberg